The 2020 Boca Raton Bowl was a college football bowl game played on December 22, 2020, with kickoff at for 7:00 p.m. EST on ESPN. It was the seventh edition of the Boca Raton Bowl, and was one of the 2020–21 bowl games concluding the 2020 FBS football season. Sponsored by roofing repair company RoofClaim.com, the game was officially known as the RoofClaim.com Boca Raton Bowl.

Teams
The 2020 Boca Raton Bowl was contested by the BYU Cougars, who competed as an independent, and the UCF Knights, from the American Athletic Conference. The two teams had met twice previously, with the series tied 1–1. The teams' last meeting had been in 2014; UCF won, 31–24. This was the teams' first meeting in a bowl game, and each team's first appearance in the Boca Raton Bowl.

BYU

On December 14, BYU accepted a bid to the bowl. The Cougars entered the bowl with a record of 10–1; they were ranked as high as number 8 in the AP Poll during the season.

UCF

On December 7, UCF of The American accepted a bid to the bowl. The Knights entered the bowl with a record of 6–3 (5–3 in conference play); they were ranked as high as number 11 in the AP Poll during the season.

Game summary

Statistics

References

External links
 Game statistics at statbroadcast.com

Boca Raton Bowl
Boca Raton Bowl
BYU Cougars football bowl games
UCF Knights football bowl games
Boca Raton Bowl
Boca Raton Bowl